Boonarga is a rural locality in the Western Downs Region, Queensland, Australia.

Geography
The Warrego Highway and Western railway line enter the locality from the south-east (Brigalow) and exit to the north-west (Chinchilla).

Boonarga railway station is an abandoned station on the Western railway line.

History 
Hill Top Provisional School opened on 20 March 1893. On 1 January 1909, it became Hill Top State School. From 1914 to 1915 it operated as a half-time school  with Mulga State School (meaning the two schools shared a single teacher). In 1936, it was renamed Boonarga State School. It closed in June 1954. It was located on the Warrego Highway.

The Cactoblastis Memorial Hall was built to celebrate the eradiction of the prickly pear in the Boonarga area through the introduction of the cactoblastis moth. Prickly pear had spread so extensively through the area that it was often not possible to walk or ride through it. A gala ball was held to mark the occasion.

Heritage listings
Boonarga has a number of heritage-listed sites, including:
 Warrego Highway: Cactoblastis Memorial Hall

Education 
There are no schools in Boonarga. The nearest government primary schools are Brigalow State School in neighbouring Brigalow to the south-east and Chinchilla State School in neighbouring Chinchilla to the north-west. The nearest government secondary school is Chinchilla State High School in Chinchilla.

Amenities 
Boonarga Cactoblastis Memorial Hall is on the Warrego Highway.

References

External links 

Western Downs Region
Localities in Queensland